The ingénue is a stock character in literature, film and a role type in the theater, generally a girl or a young woman, who is endearingly innocent. Ingénue may also refer to a new young actress or one typecast in such roles. The term comes from the feminine form of the French adjective  meaning "ingenuous" or innocent, virtuous and candid. The term may also imply a lack of sophistication and cunning.

Typically, the ingénue is beautiful, kind, gentle, sweet, virginal and often naïve; additionally, she is often in mental, emotional, or even physical danger—usually a target of the cad—whom she may have mistaken for the hero. The ingénue usually lives with her father, husband, or a father figure. The vamp (femme fatale) is often a foil for the ingénue (or the damsel in distress).

The ingénue is often accompanied by a romantic side plot. This romance is usually considered pure and harmless to both participants. In many cases, the male participant is as innocent as the ingénue. The ingénue is also similar to the girl-next-door stereotype.

In opera and musical theater, the ingénue is usually sung by a lyric soprano. The ingénue usually has the fawn-eyed innocence of a child but subtle sexual appeal as well.

See also
 Loosu ponnu
 Moe

References

External links 
 

Female stock characters